Nongthombam (shortly as Nongthomba or Nong) is a Meitei ethnic family name (surname). 
Notable people with this family name are:
 Nongthombam Biren Singh, 12th Chief Minister of Manipur
 Nongthombam Denin, Indian cricketer
 Nongthombam Sarojkumar, Indian cricketer